The Corsiglièse is a stream in the department of Haute-Corse, Corsica, France.
It is a tributary of the river Tavignano.

Course

The stream rises to the south of the village of Sant'Andréa-di-Bozio and flows in a generally south-southeast direction to its junction with the Tavignano.
It runs between the D16 or D116 to the east and the D14 to the west.
The course of the Corsiglièse follows a fault between the schist mountains and the eastern plain, an unstable area where landslides are possible.

The castrum of Petralerata (Pietr'Ellerat) was in the heart of the Corsiglièse valley, on a peak, and had a defensive character unmatched on the island.
It was first mentioned in 1149.

Tributaries
The following streams (ruisseaux) are tributaries of the Corsiglièse:

Brancuccia
Ciotte 
Vaccili 
Osse 
 Moulins
Suera
Tempiu 
Cognolare 
Rejone 
Casamora
Noce Fiuminale
Mandriale .
Fontanello
Barbuzani
Chierchiaje 
Molinello
Campu a l'Olivu
Ciocciu
Cardiccia

Notes

Sources

 

Rivers of Haute-Corse
Rivers of France